The National Geographic Institute of Guatemala (in Spanish: Instituto Geográfico Nacional "Ingeniero Alfredo Obiols Gómez" (IGN)) is a scientific agency of the Guatemalan government.

History 
IGN was created on the 29th of December 1964. In the 1930s, cartographic projects were carried out by ad hoc mapping commissions which were primarily responsible for boundary surveys. The Department of Maps and Cartography (in Spanish: Departamento de Mapas y Cartografía) was created in 1945 and followed by the creation of the Instituto Geográfico Nacional in 1964.

In 1982 the agency was renamed to Instituto Geográfico Militar (IGM) after a merger with the Military Cartographic Service, and became a dependency of the Ministry of Defence. In January 1998, following the demilitarisation of state institutions stipulated in the Peace Accords, the IGN was reinstated as a dependency of the Ministry of Communications, Infrastructure and Housing, and became a dependency of the Ministry of Agriculture in September 2006.

Notes

References 
 

IGN Resumen de actividades

Geography of Guatemala
Government agencies of Guatemala
National mapping agencies
Research institutes in Guatemala